Albanian Supercup 2007 was the 14th edition of the Albanian Supercup since its establishment in 1989. The match was contested between the Albanian Cup 2007 winners Besa Kavajë and the 2006–07 Albanian Superliga champions KF Tirana.

Details

See also
 2006–07 Albanian Superliga
 Albanian Cup 2007

References

RSSSF.com

2007
Supercup
Albanian Supercup, 2007
Albanian Supercup, 2007